The Southern California Championships also known as the Southern California Sectional Championships and later known as the Southern California Open was a men's and women's hard court tennis tournament from 1887 to 1979. It was held at various locations including Riverside (1887), then Santa Monica (1888–1903), then South Pasadena (1904), then Long Beach (1905–1920) and finally Los Angeles (1920–1979).

History
On 19 March 1887 the Southern California Lawn Tennis Association was formed with the Hon. James Bettner as its first president. The Southern California Championships were founded in March 1887 and first staged on asphalt courts at the Casa Blanca Club, Riverside, California. In August 1887 a second tournament was organized that was won by William Henry Young after which the event would be played in the last week of August. In 1888 the tournament moved to the Santa Monica Casino courts, where it remained until 1903. The tournament alternated between different locations throughout its run.

In 1968 at the start of the Open era it became an open event. The men's event remained known as the Southern California Championships until 1977 and was part of the Grand Prix Tennis circuit tour. The women's event continued as the Southern California Championships officially until 1979, but for sponsorship reasons was called the Virginia Slims of San Diego tournament for 1971 only. From 1979 to 1982 it was additionally known as the Wells Fargo Open for sponsorship reasons. Recently its been known as the Southern California Open

Men's event
The inaugural men's tournament was won by Canadian born later American citizen William Henry Young who defeated Mr C. Trevelia in the All Comer's Final. In 1968 the event became part of the International Tennis Federation independent tour. In 1970 the event became part of the Grand Prix Tennis Circuit tour until 1977. The final tournament was won by the Mexican player Raúl Ramírez who defeated the American player Brian Gottfried.

Women's event
The inaugural women's tournament was won by the American player Miss Fannie Shoemaker who defeated a Miss Dexter in the All Comer's Final. In 1968 the event became part of the International Tennis Federation independent tour. In 1971 the event became part of the Virginia Slims Circuit until 1979 when it was known as for sponsorship reasons Virginia Slims of San Diego.

Locations
The tournament was staged in different cities for the duration of its run they included:

Finals

Men's singles
Included:

References

Sources
 Ingersoll, Luther A. (1908). "XI: Outdoor Past Times". Ingersoll's century history, Santa Monica Bay cities: prefaced with a brief history of the state of California, a condensed history of Los Angeles County, 1542 to 1908. Los Angeles: Los Angeles County CA Archives.
  Los Angeles Herald, Volume 42, Number 128, 17 August 1894: Center for Biographical Studies and Research: California Digital Newspapers Collection.
  Yeoman's, Patricia Henry (1987). Southern California Tennis Champions Centennial, 1887-1987: Documents & Anecdotes. Southern California Committee for the Olympic Games. ISBN 9780960662807.

Hard court tennis tournaments
Defunct tennis tournaments in the United States